
Gmina Tuchomie is a rural gmina (administrative district) in Bytów County, Pomeranian Voivodeship, in northern Poland.

Villages
Gmina Tuchomie contains the villages and settlements of Chocimierz, Ciemno, Dalekie, Jabłoniec, Kramarzynki, Kramarzyny, Masłowice Trzebiatkowskie, Masłowice Tuchomskie, Masłowiczki, Modrzejewo, Nowe Huty, Piaszno, Piaszno Małe, Tągowie, Tesmarówka, Trzebiatkowa, Tuchomie and Tuchomko.

Neighbouring gminas
Gmina Tuchomie is bordered by the gminas of Borzytuchom, Bytów, Kołczygłowy, Lipnica and Miastko.

References
Polish official population figures 2006

Tuchomie
Bytów County